d5SICS is an artificial nucleoside containing 6-methylisoquinoline-1-thione-2-yl group instead of a base.

It pairs up with dNaM in a hydrophobic interaction. It was not able to be removed by the error-correcting machinery of the E. coli into which it was inserted. The pairing of d5SICS–dNaM is mediated by packing and hydrophobic forces instead of hydrogen bonding, which occurs in natural base pairs. Therefore, in free DNA, rings of d5SICS and dNaM are placed in parallel planes instead of the same plane. The d5SICS-dNaM pairing replaced an older dNaM-dTPT3 pairing.

References 

Nucleosides
Synthetic biology
Thioketones
Nitrogen heterocycles
Heterocyclic compounds with 2 rings